In enzymology, a tryptophan 2-C-methyltransferase is an enzyme that catalyzes the chemical reaction

S-adenosyl-L-methionine + L-tryptophan  S-adenosyl-L-homocysteine + L-2-methyltryptophan

Thus, the two substrates of this enzyme are S-adenosyl methionine and L-tryptophan, whereas its two products are S-adenosylhomocysteine and L-2-methyltryptophan.

This enzyme belongs to the family of transferases, specifically those transferring one-carbon group methyltransferases.  The systematic name of this enzyme class is S-adenosyl-L-methionine:L-tryptophan 2-C-methyltransferase. Other names in common use include tryptophan 2-methyltransferase, and S-adenosylmethionine:tryptophan 2-methyltransferase.

References

 

EC 2.1.1
Enzymes of unknown structure